Self-consistent mean field may be one of the following:

 Mean field theory, an approach to the many-body problem in physics and statistical mechanics
 Self-consistent mean field (biology), an application of this theory to the problem of protein structure prediction